Imposible is a 2004 comedy-drama film directed by Cristian Pauls and written by Alan Pauls and Cristian Pauls. The cast includes Jimena Anganuzzi, Vera Czemerinski, Damián de Santo, Francisco Fernández de Rosa, and Alejandra Flechner.

References

External links
 

2004 films
2004 comedy-drama films
2000s Spanish-language films
Argentine comedy-drama films
2000s Argentine films